Tenaga Nasional Berhad (abbreviated as TNB; TENAGA), also known as Tenaga Nasional or simply Tenaga, is the Malaysian multinational electricity company and is the only electric utility company in Peninsular Malaysia and also the largest publicly-listed power company in Southeast Asia with MYR 182.60  billion worth of assets. It serves over 10.3 million customers throughout Peninsular Malaysia (except Sarawak) and the East Malaysian state of Sabah through Sabah Electricity Sdn Bhd. TNB's core activities are in the generation, transmission and distribution of electricity. Other activities include repairing, testing and maintaining power plants, providing engineering, procurement and construction services for power plants related products, assembling and manufacturing high voltage switchgears, coal mining and trading. Operations are carried out in Malaysia, Saudi Arabia, Pakistan, India, Turkey, United Kingdom, and Cambodia. TNB also offers higher education through its university, Universiti Tenaga Nasional (Uniten).

TNB is one of the 10 companies under Khazanah Nasional, Malaysian sovereign wealth fund and also one of the 13 Malaysian companies listed on the Forbes Global 2000 in 2018. TNB is ranked 16th globally in Brand Finance: Utilities 50 2021 Ranking and 226th globally in 2020 Bentley Infrastructure 500.

History

Lembaga Letrik Pusat (1949-1965)
The Lembaga Letrik Pusat (Central Electricity Board, CEB) was established and came into operation on 1 September 1949. The Board was to become heir to three major projects considered by the Electricity Department following its re-establishment in April 1946 which were the Connaught Bridge Power Station, Cameron Highlands Hydroelectric Project & the development of a National Grid. CEB eventually became the owner of 34 power stations with a generation capacity of 39.88 MW, including a steam power station in Bangsar with a capacity of 26.5 MW, a hydroelectric power station at Ulu Langat with a capacity of 2.28 MW, and various diesel powered generators with a total capacity of 11.1 MW.

Lembaga Letrik Negara (1965-1990)
On 22 June 1965, Central Electricity Board (CEB) of the Federation of Malaya was renamed the Lembaga Letrik Negara (National Electricity Board, NEB) of the States of Malaya. By the 1980s, the Board was supplying the whole peninsula with electricity, replacing the Perak River Hydro Electric Power company (PRHEP) and its subsidiary Kinta Electrical Distribution Co. Ltd (KED) in 1982, Penang Municipality in 1976, and areas supplied by Huttenbach Ltd in 1964, which included Alor Setar, Sungai Petani, Kulim, Lunas, Padang Serai, Telok Anson, Langkap, Tampin and Kuala Pilah.

On 4 May 1988, Prime Minister Mahathir Mohamad announced the government’s decision on a policy of privatisation. Two pieces of legislation were passed to replace the Electricity Act and to provide for the establishment of a new corporation.  Tenaga Nasional Berhad (TNB) was formed in 1990 by the Electricity Supply Successor Company Act 1990, to succeed the National Electricity Board (NEB) of the States of Malaya.

Corporate Governance
Tan Sri Leo Moggie is TNB’s former chairman and Non-Independent Non-Executive Chairman from 12 April 2004 to 11 March 2020. Ahmad Badri Mohd Zahir was the new chairman of the company, appointed on 12 March 2020, succeeding Moggie.

UEM Edgenta chairman, Amir Hamzah Tun Azizan was appointed as the new CEO and President since 2 April 2019 succeeding Datuk Seri Ir. Azman Mohd who resigned on 31 March.

Divisions

Generation

The Generation division owns and operates thermal assets and hydroelectric generation schemes in Peninsular Malaysia and one Independent Power Producer (IPP) operating in Pakistan. In the peninsula, it has a generation capacity of 11,296 MW.

Plans to expand its generation capacity include increasing hydroelectric generation by 2015 and commissioning the first nuclear power plant in Malaysia by 2025 if the government decides to include nuclear as an acceptable energy option. In 2021, Tenaga became part owner of the repowered Blyth Offshore Wind Farm in England.

Transmission
The TNB Group has a complete power supply system, including the National Grid which is energised at 132, 275 and 500 kilovolt (kV), with its tallest electricity pylon in Malaysia and Southeast Asia being the Kerinchi Pylon located near Menara Telekom, Kerinchi, Kuala Lumpur. The National Grid is linked via 132 kV HVAC and 300 kV HVDC interconnection to Thailand and 230 kV cables to Singapore.

TNB, through its subsidiaries, is also involved in the manufacturing of transformers, high voltage switchgears and electrical cables, consultancy services, architectural, civil and electrical engineering works and services, repair and maintenance services and fuel undertakes research and development, property development, and project management services.

Distribution
The Distribution division conducts the distribution network operations and electricity retail operations of TNB. The division plans, constructs, operates, performs repairs and maintenance and manages the assets of the 33 kV, 22 kV, 11 kV, 6.6 kV and 415/240 volt in the Peninsular Malaysia distribution network. Sabah Electricity provides the same function in the state of Sabah.

To conduct its electricity retailing business, it operates a network of state and area offices to purchase electricity from embedded generators, market and sell electricity, connect new supply, provide counter services, collect revenues, operate call management centres, provide supply restoration services, and implements customer and government relationships.

Branding
Since its privatization, the corporate slogan of TNB is 'Penggerak Kemajuan Negara' or Powering the Nation. Since 2013, the company has adopt new corporate slogan campaign, 'Better. Brighter'.

See also
 Electricity sector in Malaysia
 National Grid, Malaysia
 Sabah Electricity
 Sarawak Energy

Notes

References

External links

 

 
1990 establishments in Malaysia
Government-owned companies of Malaysia
Electric power companies of Malaysia
Energy companies established in 1990
Companies listed on Bursa Malaysia
Khazanah Nasional
Multinational companies headquartered in Malaysia